The 2011 Holy Cross Crusaders football team represented the College of the Holy Cross in the 2011 NCAA Division I FCS football season. The Crusaders were led by eighth-year head coach Tom Gilmore and played their home games at Fitton Field. They are a member of the Patriot League. They finished the season 6–5, 4–2 in Patriot League play to finish in a tie for second place.

Schedule

References

Holy Cross
Holy Cross Crusaders football seasons
Holy Cross Crusaders football